Rug Rage was the 1993 game of the FIRST Robotics Competition. In it, teams competed individually to score as many balls as possible in their goal.

Game overview

Field

The edge of the field was lined with PVC pipe. There were four scoring areas, two on each long side of the field set  from the ends. The four robots started in the corners of the field and scored in the goal in the same corner. The goals had horizontal cross bars at their entrances creating an  opening. This allowed the small balls to roll in easily but kept out the  balls.

Gameplay
Four robots played individually in each 2-minute match. In the center of the field were five, red balls worth 5 points and twenty, water-filled, blue balls worth 1 point. The goal was to ferry balls into a team's respective goal and earn the most points. As the large balls couldn't fit under the goals' cross bar, they had to be lifted over. In the event of a tie, the team with the most large balls scored in its goal won.

Robots
Unlike the previous year, robots were powered by an on-board battery and not an umbilical. Robots were controlled by an on-board Motorola micro controller. Commands were sent by the drivers through an 8 position joystick and a Termiflex keypad controller.

Awards
The following awards were presented at the competition:
Chairman's Award
Most Creative Design
Best Offensive Round
Outstanding Defense
Best Play of the Day
Best Team Spirit Display
Best Sportsmanship
Number One Seed

References

External links

1993 in robotics
FIRST Robotics Competition games